Baghaita is a village in Pindra Tehsil of Varanasi district in the Indian state of Uttar Pradesh. The village falls under Nihalapur gram panchayat. The village is about 20 kilometers North-West of Varanasi city, 266 kilometers South-East of state capital Lucknow and 804 kilometers South-East of the national capital Delhi.

Demography
Baghaita has 8 families with the total population of 41. Sex ratio of the village is 1,158 and child sex ratio is 5,000. Uttar Pradesh state average for both ratios is 912 and 902 respectively .

Transportation
Baghaita is connected by air (Lal Bahadur Shastri Airport), train (Babatpur railway station) and by road. The nearest operational airports are Varanasi airport (5.5 kilometers South) and Allahabad Airports (143 kilometers West).

See also
Pindra Tehsil
Pindra (Assembly constituency)

Notes
  All demographic data is based on 2011 Census of India.

References 

Villages in Varanasi district